Oliver Thomas Rossiter (born 4 September 1991) is an English professional footballer who plays as a defender for Hong Kong Football Club.

Career statistics

Club

Notes

References

External links
 Yau Yee Football League profile

Living people
1991 births
English footballers
Association football defenders
Hong Kong First Division League players
Hong Kong FC players
English expatriate footballers
English expatriate sportspeople in Hong Kong
Expatriate footballers in Hong Kong